Groton High School may refer to:

 Groton High School (Groton, Massachusetts), listed on the NRHP in Middlesex County, Massachusetts
Groton High School (Groton, New York)
Former Groton High School (Groton, New York), listed on the NRHP in Tompkins County, New York
Groton High School (Groton, South Dakota)